In computer technology and telecommunications, the term online refers to a state of having connectivity.

Online may also refer to:

Arts, entertainment, and media

Films
On Line (2002 film), American drama film
On Line (2015 film), Chinese science fiction action film

Music
Online (album), a 2001 album by the Latvian rock band Brainstorm
"Online" (Brainstorm song)
"Online" (Brad Paisley song), 2007 song recorded by American country music artist Brad Paisley
"Online", a 2006 song by Gnarls Barkley from St. Elsewhere

Periodicals
Online (magazine), magazine for information systems first published in 1977

Computing and technology
.online, a generic top-level domain
Online algorithm, an algorithm which doesn't require the whole input from the start
Online analytical processing, an approach to answer multi-dimensional analytical (MDA) queries swiftly
Online machine learning, a method of machine learning in which data becomes available in a sequential order
 Online SAS, French cloud computing and hosting company

Other uses
One Nevada Transmission Line (ONLine), proposed electrical power line in Nevada

See also
Offline (disambiguation)
Online storage (disambiguation)